The 1961 Open Championship was the 90th Open Championship, played 12–15 July at Royal Birkdale Golf Club in Southport, England. Arnold Palmer won the first of two consecutive Open Championships, one stroke ahead of Dai Rees. It was the second Open for Palmer, the runner-up in his first in 1960, and the fourth of his seven major titles. He was the first American to win the Claret Jug since Ben Hogan in 1953. This was the second Open Championship at Royal Birkdale, which hosted in 1954.

Qualifying took place on 10–11 July. Entries played 18 holes on the Championship course and 18 holes at Hillside Golf Club. The number of qualifiers was limited to a maximum of 120. Ties for 120th place would not qualify. The qualifying score was 151 and 108 players qualified. There were 22 players on 152. Bob Charles led the qualifiers on 136, two ahead of Gary Player. A maximum of 50 players could make the cut after 36 holes. Ties for 50th place did not make the cut.

Gale-force winds caused scores to soar during the second round on Thursday,
followed by heavy rains which washed out both rounds on Friday. Cancellation was a possibility, but the weather cooperated enough to play the third and fourth rounds in showers on Saturday.

1959 Open champion and reigning Masters champion Gary Player withdrew early in the third round due to a stomach ailment.

Course layout

Past champions in the field

Made the cut

Missed the cut

Round summaries

First round
Wednesday, 12 July 1961

Second round
Thursday, 13 July 1961

Amateurs: Christmas (+6), White (+6), Chapman (+11), Bonallack (+15), Carr (+17), Reece (+18), Pearson (+25)

Third round
Saturday, 15 July 1961 - (morning)

Final round
Saturday, 15 July 1961 - (afternoon)
   
Amateurs: White (+18), Christmas (+20)

References

External links
Royal Birkdale 1961 (Official site)

The Open Championship
Golf tournaments in England
Open Championship
Open Championship
Open Championship